Hampton Barnett Hawes Jr. (November 13, 1928 – May 22, 1977) was an American jazz pianist. He was the author of the memoir Raise Up Off Me, which won the Deems-Taylor Award for music writing in 1975.

Early life
Hampton Hawes was born on November 13, 1928, in Los Angeles, California. His father, Hampton Hawes Sr., was minister of Westminster Presbyterian Church in Los Angeles. His mother, the former Gertrude Holman, was Westminster's church pianist. Hawes' first experience with the piano was as a toddler sitting on his mother's lap while she practiced. He was reportedly able to pick out fairly complex tunes by the age of three.

Later life and career

Hawes was self-taught; by his teens he was playing with the leading jazz musicians on the West Coast, including Dexter Gordon, Wardell Gray, Art Pepper, Shorty Rogers, and Teddy Edwards. His second professional job, at 18, was playing for eight months with the Howard McGhee Quintet at the Hi De Ho Club, in a group that included Charlie Parker. By late 1947, Hawes' reputation was leading to studio recording work. Early studio dates included work for George L. "Happy" Johnson, Teddy Edwards, Sonny Criss, and Shorty Rogers. From 1948 to 1952, he was recorded live on several occasions at Los Angeles-area jazz clubs including The Haig, The Lighthouse, and The Surf Club. By December 1952, he had recorded eight songs under his own name for Prestige Records with a quartet featuring Larry Bunker on vibraphone.

After serving in the U.S. Army in Japan from 1952 to 1954, Hawes formed his own trio, with bassist Red Mitchell and drummer Chuck Thompson. The three-record Trio sessions made by this group in 1955 on Contemporary Records were considered some of the finest records to come out of the West Coast at the time. The next year, Hawes added guitarist Jim Hall for the All Night Sessions. These were three records made during a non-stop overnight recording session.

After a six-month national tour in 1956, Hawes won the "New Star of the Year" award in Down Beat magazine, and "Arrival of the Year" in Metronome. The following year, he recorded in New York City with Charles Mingus on the album Mingus Three (Jubilee, 1957).

Struggling for many years with a heroin addiction, in 1958 Hawes became the target of a federal undercover operation in Los Angeles. Investigators believed that he would inform on suppliers rather than risk ruining a successful music career. Hawes was arrested on heroin charges on his 30th birthday and was sentenced to ten years imprisonment. In the intervening weeks between his trial and sentencing, Hawes recorded an album of spirituals and gospel songs, The Sermon.

In 1961, while at a federal prison hospital in Fort Worth, Texas, Hawes was watching President Kennedy's inaugural speech on television, and became convinced that Kennedy would pardon him. With help from inside and outside the prison, Hawes submitted an official request for a presidential pardon. In August 1963, Kennedy granted Hawes Executive Clemency, the 42nd of only 43 such pardons given in the final year of Kennedy's presidency.

After being released from prison, Hawes resumed playing and recording. During a ten-month tour of Europe, Asia, and the Middle East, Hawes recorded nine albums, played sold out shows and concert halls in ten countries, and was covered widely in the press, including appearances on European television and radio.

Raise Up Off Me, Hawes' autobiography, written with Don Asher and published in 1974, shed light on his heroin addiction, the bebop movement, and his friendships with some of the leading jazz musicians of his time. It won the ASCAP Deems Taylor Award for music writing in 1975. Critic Gary Giddins, who wrote the book's introduction, called Raise Up Off Me "a major contribution to the literature of jazz." The Penguin Guide to Jazz cites it as "one of the most moving memoirs ever written by a musician, and a classic of jazz writing."

Hampton Hawes died unexpectedly of a brain hemorrhage in 1977, at the age of 48.

Style and influence
Hawes' playing style developed in the early 1950s. He included "figures used by Parker and [Bud] Powell (but he played with a cleaner articulation than Powell), some Oscar Peterson phrases, and later, some Bill Evans phrases[...], and an impressive locked-hands style in which the top notes always sang out clearly." He also helped develop "the double-note blues figures and rhythmically compelling comping style that Horace Silver and others were to use in the mid-1950s." His technique featured "great facility with rapid runs and a versatile control of touch."

Hawes influenced a great number of prominent pianists, including André Previn, Peterson, Horace Silver, Claude Williamson, Pete Jolly, and Toshiko Akiyoshi. Hawes' own influences came from a number of sources, including the gospel music and spirituals he heard in his father's church as a child, and the boogie-woogie piano of Earl Hines. Hawes also learned much from pianists Powell and Nat King Cole, among others. By Hawes' own account, however, his principal source of influence was his friend Charlie Parker.

Discography

As leader/co-leader

As sideman 

With Dexter Gordon
 The Hunt (Savoy Records, 1947) – recorded in 1977
 Blues à la Suisse (Prestige, 1973)

With Barney Kessel
 Kessel Plays Standards (Contemporary, 1955)
 Let's Cook! (Contemporary, 1962) – recorded in 1957

With Art Pepper
 Surf Ride (Savoy, 1956) – recorded in 1952–54
 Living Legend (Contemporary, 1975)
 The Early Show (Xanadu, 1979) – recorded in 1952

With Shorty Rogers 
 Modern Sounds (Capitol, 1951)
 Shorty Rogers and His Giants (RCA Victor, 1953)

With others
 Gene Ammons, Gene Ammons and Friends at Montreux (Prestige, 1973)
 Sonny Criss, I'll Catch the Sun! (Prestige, 1969)
 Art Farmer, On the Road (Contemporary, 1976)
 Wardell Gray,   Live in Hollywood (Xanadu, 1978) – recorded in 1952
 Warne Marsh, Live in Hollywood (Xanadu, 1979) – recorded in 1952
 Charles Mingus, Mingus Three (Jubilee, 1957)
 Blue Mitchell, Stratosonic Nuances (RCA, 1975)
 Red Mitchell, Red Mitchell (Bethlehem, 1955)
 Sonny Rollins, Sonny Rollins and the Contemporary Leaders (Contemporary, 1958)
 Bud Shank, Bud Shank – Shorty Rogers – Bill Perkins (Pacific Jazz, 1955)
 Sonny Stitt, So Doggone Good (Prestige, 1972)

Bibliography
 Raise Up Off Me: A Portrait of Hampton Hawes by Hampton Hawes, Don Asher, and Gary Giddins
 Hampton Hawes: A Discography by Roger Hunter & Mike Davis. 127pp. Manana Publications, Manchester, England. 1986.

See also

List of people pardoned or granted clemency by the president of the United States

References

External links
Hampton Hawes at Find A Grave
 Hampton Hawes Discography
 "Hampton Hawes and the Low Blues" by Ethan Iverson

1928 births
1977 deaths
African-American pianists
American jazz pianists
American male pianists
Bebop pianists
Contemporary Records artists
Enja Records artists
Freedom Records artists
Hard bop pianists
Jazz-funk pianists
Jazz fusion pianists
Mainstream jazz pianists
People from Greater Los Angeles
Prestige Records artists
Soul-jazz pianists
Recipients of American presidential clemency
West Coast jazz pianists
20th-century American pianists
20th-century American male musicians
American male jazz musicians
Black Lion Records artists
Discovery Records artists
20th-century African-American musicians